is a 1970 Japanese kaiju film directed by Noriaki Yuasa, written by Niisan Takahashi, and produced by Daiei Film. It is the sixth entry in the Gamera film series, following Gamera vs. Guiron, which was released one year prior. Gamera vs. Jiger stars Tsutomu Takakuwa, Kelly Burris, Katherine Murphy, and Kon Ohmura, and features the fictional giant flying turtle monster Gamera. The film was released theatrically in Japan on 21 March 1970, and did not receive a theatrical release in the United States, instead being released directly to television by American International Television in 1970 under the title Gamera vs. Monster X. The film was followed by Gamera vs. Zigra the following year.

Plot

Japan is preparing for Expo '70, to be held in Osaka. Construction of the various buildings and pavilions is well under way. On Wester Island in the Pacific Ocean, a large statue of mysterious origin (called the Devil's Whistle) is located by scientists. The removal of the statue is hampered first by a tribal member of the Wester Island people, then by the unexpected arrival of Gamera, who aggressively attempts to prevent the removal of the statue, only to be shot at by the crew instead. The statue is removed from the island successfully after a volcano erupts. Shortly after departing the island, members of the ship's crew begin to fall ill. The statue appears to be the source of the outbreak, as it makes a continuous piercing sound, driving many of the crew members insane.

After the statue is removed, Jiger makes her first appearance and gets Gamera's immediate attention. The first of several fights ensues and Jiger wins by shooting projectile quills from her face. To make matters worse, Gamera is on his back and cannot move. He pulls himself up with his tail using a large rock, then removes the embedded quills from his limbs and is finally able to fly after Jiger.

Meanwhile, Jiger is actively seeking the statue, because it is making a horrible ringing sound that is causing her tremendous pain. Scientists are beside themselves as Jiger displays another weapon: a heat ray that vaporizes not only flesh, but entire city blocks. The JSDF does make a token effort to kill the kaiju, but her quills knock down the F-104 Starfighters, ending that involvement.

Gamera returns for round two as the fight is witnessed by several children. Gamera knocks Jiger around and has the upper hand, until Jiger pulls Gamera to her. Jiger extends a stinger from her tail and inserts the barb into Gamera's chest, laying an egg inside his lung. Gamera staggers away, roaring in agony. Finally, he barely makes it to the bay and his body turns a chalky white color, almost like ice. Gamera is presumed to have been killed at this point, as Jiger heads straight to Expo '70. Jiger finally obtains the statue and throws it into the ocean, ending the painful noise.

The children convince them to do a medical exam on the comatose Gamera, where it is discovered that there is a dark spot on one of his lungs. One of the scientists served as a zoo director and realises that the spot might not be a fast-spreading cancer, but actually a parasitic infant Jiger growing inside Gamera. An operation is needed to remove the threat, so the children take the initiative by taking a walkie-talkie and a mini-sub. Communication is established with the kids and they enter Gamera through his open mouth, and after almost going into his stomach, they arrive at the problem lung. The children are able to exit the sub and walk around in the lung. There, they discover the baby.

The baby looks like a tiny version of its mother, except that instead of shooting quills, it squirts a sticky goo. The baby attacks them, but it has a weakness just like its mother: white noise. The kids discover that this is actually a fatal weakness and manage to kill the baby, using static from their walkie-talkie. They leave Gamera's body and report their findings to the scientists. They rig up large speakers to keep Jiger at bay, as well as figure out that power would have to also be run into Gamera, who seemingly cannot recover on his own. The children make a final trip inside Gamera to hook up a set of power lines directly to his heart.

Jiger is kept immobile by the speakers playing the white noise. It is not enough to kill her, but buys enough time for the other plan to get started. Gamera is subjected to high voltage shock before the electrical grid overloads. It is enough that Gamera does revive on his own.

Gamera flies over to the World's Fair for the final battle. Jiger tries every weapon she has got, but Gamera has learned from his previous battles with her. After her spears fail to affect him, Jiger then uses her heat ray, the one weapon she has yet to use on him. It does not affect Gamera's shell or even his skin (likely due to Gamera's resistance to heat), but the sound it generates threatens to rupture his eardrums. Luckily, Gamera is able to put telephone poles into his ears to protect them from the sound. After trying all her other attacks, Jiger resorts to her tail stinger again, but Gamera is prepared for it this time and uses a building to smash her tail and destroy the stinger. Gamera body-slams Jiger several times from great heights, but Jiger is not affected. However, it buys Gamera the time needed to go into the ocean and retrieve the statue from the ocean floor. Jiger, enraged by the statue's return, attempts to catch the flying Gamera. Gamera taunts Jiger with the statue, who tries in vain to catch Gamera and retrieve it. Gamera finally ends the fight by throwing the statue at Jiger, which embeds itself in Jiger's skull, killing her. Gamera then returns the devil beast's carcass to Wester Island.

Cast

Production
As boys magazines at the time had stories on ancient civilizations that were popular,  Nisan Takahashi's early script, titled Gamera vs. Giant Demon Beast X (ガメラ対大魔獣X, Gamera tai Dai Majū Ekkusu), constructed around an ancient monster from the lost continent of Mu. Takahashi also wanted to include an “occult” element with Jiger and the cursed statue.

Reportedly director Yuasa coerced then Daiei president Nagata Masakazu to fork over an additional allotment of 30 million yen (approximately 100,000 US dollars at that time) to beef up the effects budget.

In the film, Jiger nor Gamera do not destroy any of the buildings of the Expo 70 fair because the Expo board members had forbidden it.

Gamera vs. Jiger was the sixth film in the Gamera series.The American version of the film includes stock footage from Gamera vs. Guiron and Gamera vs. Barugon.

Release
Gamera vs. Jiger was released in Japan on March 21, 1970, on a double bill The Invisible Swordsman. The film was never released theatrically in the United States. It was released directly to television by American International Television in 1970 as Gamera vs. Monster X.

Home media
Shout! Factory has released the film on September 21, 2010, on DVD as a double feature with Gamera vs. Guiron.

Image Entertainment released the American version of the film in 2004 on DVD as a double feature with Monster from a Prehistoric Planet.

Legacy 
Gamera vs. Jiger was featured in season 13 (2022) of Mystery Science Theater 3000, a show that has frequently featured Gamera films. It was the first new episode featuring a Gamera film since Gamera vs. Zigra in season 3 (1991).

See also
 List of Japanese films of 1970

Notes

References

Footnotes

Sources

External links

 Gamera vs Jiger at Gamera web archive (Japanese)
 
 ガメラ対大魔獣ジャイガー (Gamera tai Daimajū Jaigā (in Japanese) at Japanese Movie Database
 

1970 films
1970s fantasy films
Daiei Film films
Expo '70
Films directed by Noriaki Yuasa
Films set in Osaka
Gamera films
Giant monster films
Japanese sequel films
Kaiju films
Films about abortion
World's fairs in fiction
Films scored by Shunsuke Kikuchi
1970s Japanese films